Herzog Township is a township in Ellis County, Kansas, USA.  As of the 2010 census, its population was 894.

Geography
According to the USGS, it contains three cemeteries: Sacred Heart, Saint Anna and Saint Fidelis.

The stream of Sweetwater Creek runs through this township.

Transportation
Herzog Township contains one airport or landing strip, Victoria Pratt Airport.

References

External links
 US-Counties.com
 City-Data.com

Townships in Ellis County, Kansas
Townships in Kansas